Letana is a genus of bush cricket: characteristic of the tribe Letanini and placed in the subfamily Phaneropterinae. Species can be found in Asia: mostly India, China and Indo-China.

Species
The Orthoptera Species File and Catalogue of Life list:
Letana atomifera Brunner von Wattenwyl, 1878
Letana bilobata Ingrisch, 1990
Letana brachyptera Ingrisch, 1987
Letana brevicaudata Brunner von Wattenwyl, 1893
Letana bulbosa Ingrisch, 1990
Letana despecta Brunner von Wattenwyl, 1878
Letana dentata Nagar & Swaminathan, 2015
Letana digitata Ingrisch, 1990
Letana emanueli Ingrisch, 1990
Letana ganesha Ingrisch & Garai, 2001
Letana gracilis Ingrisch, 1990
Letana grandis Liu & Xia, 1992
Letana inflata Brunner von Wattenwyl, 1878
Letana infurcata Ingrisch, 1990
Letana intermedia Ingrisch, 1990
Letana linearis Walker, 1869 - type species
Letana magna Ingrisch, 1990
Letana megastridula Ingrisch, 1990
Letana mursinga Ingrisch & Shishodia, 2000
Letana navasi Bolívar, 1914
Letana nigropoda Ingrisch, 1987
Letana nigrosparsa Walker, 1871
Letana pyrifera Bey-Bienko, 1956
Letana recticercis Chopard & Dreux, 1966
Letana rubescens Stål, 1861
Letana rufonotata Serville, 1838
Letana serricauda Ingrisch, 1990
Letana sinumarginis Liu & Xia, 1992

References

External Links & Illustrations
Flickr: Len Worthington Letana rubescens (Stål, 1861) male
Letana image in Farangs gone wild: Tettigonioidea of Thailand

Orthoptera genera
Phaneropterinae